Karin Luck (later Bauschke-Luck) is a German rower who competed for the SC Dynamo Berlin / Sportvereinigung (SV) Dynamo. She is a retired German coxswain who won four medals at European championships from 1966 to 1970.

References 

Living people
Year of birth missing (living people)
East German female rowers
World Rowing Championships medalists for East Germany
Coxswains (rowing)
European Rowing Championships medalists